Sky Sport is a group of sports-oriented television channels operated by New Zealand's satellite pay-TV company, Sky.

History 
Sky Sport 1 is the original Sky Television sport channel in New Zealand. It was first introduced in 1990 as Sky Sport on the Sky UHF service. When Sky Sport began it operated between the hours of noon and around midnight, and occasionally screened live sports events outside these hours. By July 1991, Sky Sport commenced 24-hour transmission with a direct feed of ESPN at certain times during the week.

A sister channel, Sky Sport 2 was launched in 1997 when Sky introduced a nationwide analogue direct broadcasting via satellite (DBS) service, followed by a third channel, Sky Sport 3 in 2003 and Sky Sport 4 in 2013.

On 1 August 2019, Sky launched five more Sky Sport channels, numbered from 5 to 9. Additionally all the channels were re-aligned to be sport-specific, and a Sky Sport News channel was launched providing the latest news and updates from across all sports. However, due to the COVID-19 pandemic in New Zealand, the Sky Sport News channel was rebranded as Sky Sport Select, a combination of sports news and general sporting coverage.

Channels 
Ten main channels comprise the Sky Sport service

All Sky Sport channels are broadcast in 1080i high definition.

Pop-up channels 
Additional Sky Sport channels are launched in order to broadcast major events such as the Australian Tennis Open and the Olympic Games.

Outside Broadcasting  
Sky owned Outside Broadcasting Limited from 2010 to 2021, providing outside broadcast facilities for Sky Sport coverage with eight broadcast trucks and fly away kits. These traveled the length of New Zealand and overseas to cover events for Sky Sport. These trucks were also contracted out to other television networks like TVNZ and Māori Television. On 12 August 2020, Sky announced it had sold Outside Broadcasting to NEP New Zealand, part of American production company NEP Group. As part of the transaction, NEP will be Sky's outsourced technical production partner in New Zealand until at least 2030. The sale was cleared by the Commerce Commission on 5 February 2021.

Sky Sport Now

On 14 August 2019, Sky launched Sky Sport Now, featuring online live streams for all 10 Sky Sport channels, highlights, on demand, match statistics and points tables. Three passes are available for purchase: a week pass, a month pass and a 12-month Pass. Pay-Per-View events can be purchased separately when they become available. Sky Sport Now is available via internet browsers as well as on iOS, Android and PlayStation 4 devices.

On 27 October 2020, Sky announced that its Sky Sport Now streaming service would be bundled with Spark Sport for a NZ$49.99 monthly subscription from 16 November 2020 onwards.

Sports

Association football

Football
From 2019 until 2023, matches aired on Sky Sport are also available on beIN Sports platforms due to a four-year partnership contract.

Leagues
 A-League and A-League Women
 Premier League
 Serie A
 La Liga
 Bundesliga
 New Zealand Football Championship (finals coverage only)
 New Zealand Football (Men's and Women's national teams)

Domestic cups
 English FA Cup
 FA Community Shield
 Chatham Cup (final only)
 Kate Sheppard Cup

International club competitions
 FIFA Club World Cup (2019-2022)

International matches
 World Cup Qualifying
 European Championship qualifying
 Other International Matches

International tournaments
 FIFA World Cups (through 2022)
 Men's:
 FIFA World Cup
 FIFA U-20 World Cup
 FIFA U-17 World Cup
 Women's:
 FIFA Women's World Cup
 FIFA U-20 Women's World Cup
 FIFA U-17 Women's World Cup
 UEFA
 UEFA Euro 2020
 UEFA Nations League

Beach Soccer
 FIFA Beach Soccer World Cup (2019 and 2021)

Futsal
International tournaments
 FIFA Futsal World Cup

Athletics
 IAAF Golden League
 World Athletics

Australian rules
 Australian Football League: One live game per week, plus weekly highlights.

Basketball
 National Basketball League
 National Basketball League (Australia): One game every Thursday night; live coverage of Semifinal, and Grand Final.

Cricket
 Overseas cricket:
 International fixtures - Cricket Australia, BCCI (India), Cricket South Africa, Cricket West Indies and Pakistan Cricket Board.
 Australian domestic competitions: Sheffield Shield, One-Day Cup, Women's National Cricket League, Big Bash League and Women's Big Bash League.
 Indian Premier League, Caribbean Premier League, Super50 Cup and Pakistan Super League.
 ICC
 All major ICC events: Men's Cricket World Cup, Women's Cricket World Cup, Men's T20 World Cup, Women's T20 World Cup, World Test Championship and Under-19 Cricket World Cup.

Cycling
 Tour de France

Golf
 The Open Championship
 Ryder Cup
 European Tour
 PGA Tour
 U.S. Open
 U.S. Masters
 World Golf Championships
 World Cup
 New Zealand Open
 LPGA Tour
 Evian Masters

Motor racing
 Formula One
 NASCAR
 IndyCar Series
 Formula E
 W Series
 Australian Supercars Championship (Includes support categories)
 Dunlop Super2 Series
 Superbike World Championship

Multi-discipline events
 Commonwealth Games (2022 and 2026)
 Summer Olympics (2020, free coverage is sublicensed with TVNZ)
 Winter Olympics

Netball
 ANZ Premiership
 2019 Netball World Cup
 International Netball
 National Netball League
 Suncorp Super Netball

Rowing
 World Rowing Championships
 Rowing World Cup

Rugby league
 National Rugby League: Live coverage of all games
 New South Wales Cup: All Warriors home games live, plus any games available from Fox Sports
 State of Origin
 Super League
 Rugby League Challenge Cup
 Four Nations

Rugby union
 All Blacks, Black Ferns and Maori All Blacks
 The Rugby Championship: Live coverage of all games
 Super Rugby: Live coverage of all games
 Rugby World Cup
 World Rugby Sevens Series
 College 1st XV coverage: Live and delayed coverage and highlights of televised matches during the week.
 National Provincial Championship: Live coverage of all games
 Heartland Championship
 Farah Palmer Cup: Live coverage of all games
 National Sevens
 Six Nations Championship
 Premiership Rugby
 United Rugby Championship
 Currie Cup

Swimming
 FINA World Aquatics Championships

Tennis
 Australian Open
 French Open
 ASB Classic
 Davis Cup
 Fed Cup
 The Championships, Wimbledon

Former logos

References

External links
 Official Site

Television stations in New Zealand
Sports television networks in New Zealand
Television channels and stations established in 1990
English-language television stations in New Zealand